Edward St. Lawrence was an Anglican priest in Ireland in the 19th century.

St. Lawrence educated at Trinity College, Dublin. He was Prebendary of Killaspugmullane in Cork Cathedral  from 1823  Cork; and Archdeacon of Ross from 1825, holding both posts until his death on 23 May 1842.

Notes

Alumni of Trinity College Dublin
19th-century Irish Anglican priests
1842 deaths
Archdeacons of Ross, Ireland